The following is a list of all team-to-team transactions that have occurred in the National Hockey League during the 1974–75 NHL season.  It lists what team each player has been traded to, signed by, or claimed by, and for which players or draft picks, if applicable.

May 

 Trade completed on June 14, 1974.

June

July

August

September 

 Trade completed on September 16, 1974.

October

November

December

January

February

March 

Transactions
National Hockey League transactions